Fredrik Ludvig Andreas Vibe Aubert (28 January 1851 – 10 May 1913) was a Norwegian art educator, art historian and art critic.

Biography
Andreas Aubert was the son of  Ludvig Cæsar Martin Aubert (1807-1877) who was a classical scholar and professor of philology at the University of Oslo.
His elder brother Ludvig Mariboe Benjamin Aubert (1838-1896) was a jurist and professor. His sister-in-law was novelist Elise Aubert (1837- 1909). He was married to Martha Johanne Védastine Moe (1855–1933), becoming the son-in-law of Bishop Jørgen Moe (1813-1882) and brother-in-law of writer Moltke Moe (1859-1913). 

Andreas Aubert  was a student at Norwegian National Academy of Craft and Art Industry (1869–71), before he began to study theology. He studied theology  cand.theol. (1877) and then worked as a teacher at Aars og Voss' skole (1878–1895). He was also employed as an art critic at Morgenbladet, Aftenposten and   Dagbladet.
Andreas Aubert wrote extensively about Norwegian artist, Johan Christian Dahl starting with an autobiography titled Professor Dahl. Et stykke af Aarhundredets Kunst- og Kulturhistorie in 1893. As an art historian, his major works were the fundamental studies of the art of  Johan Christian Dahl which won him an annual government scholarship in 1895 and ended his teaching career. He became a professional art historian, critic and researcher.

Aubert also championed Edvard Munch,  Puvis de Chavannes, Arnold Böcklin, Max Klinger, Gabriel von Max, and Vilhelm Hammershøi. He described them as "neurasthenics", by which he meant that their art was oriented toward the psychological. He had an important role in restoring the legacy of the German Romantic painter Caspar David Friedrich, now considered the leading artist of that period, toward the end of the 19th century.

Selected works
Professor Dahl. Et stykke af Aarhundredets Kunst- og Kulturhistorie (1893)
Den Norske Naturfølelse og Professor Dahl. Hans Kunst og dens Stilling i Aarhundredets Utvikling (1894)
Thomas Fearnley. En biografisk skisse (1903)
Runge und die Romantik, Berlin 1909 (no. ed. Runge og romantikken, 1911).
Caspar David Friedrich. Gott, Freiheit, Vaterland, aus dem Nachlass des Verfassers hrsg. von G. J. Kern, Berlin 1915.
Norsk kultur og norsk kunst with C. W. Schnitler, (1917)
Maleren Johan Christian Dahl. Et stykke av forrige aarhundres kunst- og kulturhistorie (1920)

References

Other sources
 Mosley, Philip. Rodenbach, Georges: Critical Essays. Fairleigh Dickinson University Press, 1996, p. 158 (note 33). .

External links
 

1851 births
1913 deaths
Writers from Oslo
Oslo National Academy of the Arts alumni
Norwegian educators
Norwegian art critics
Norwegian art historians
Art educatorso
d'Aubert family